The 2014 Ottawa municipal election was a municipal election that was held on October 27, 2014, to elect the mayor of Ottawa, Ottawa City Council and the Ottawa-Carleton Public and Catholic School Boards. The election was held on the same day as elections in every other municipality in Ontario.

Mayoral candidates

Bernard Couchman
Nominated July 23. Immigrant from Guyana; operates a marketing company.

Mike Maguire
2010 mayoral candidate Mike Maguire announced he was running for mayor and was nominated on January 7, 2014. He launched his official campaign on June 25

Rebecca Pyrah
Prostate cancer activist and Carleton University student. Nominated September 11.

Michael St. Arnaud
Ran for mayor in 2010, winning 0.07% of the vote. Nominated September 11.

Anwar Syed
Engineer born in Aurangabad, India and emigrated to Canada in 1999. Ran as an independent in the 2006 Canadian federal election in Ottawa Centre, placing sixth with 0.2%. He was nominated August 15.

Jim Watson
Mayor Jim Watson declared his intention and ran again for election. He was nominated on March 24 and launched his campaign on April 27.

Robert White
White was nominated for mayor in 2010 but dropped out after a month. He was nominated on June 27.

Darren W. Wood
Wood, originally from Niagara Falls, ran as an independent in the 1999 provincial election (in Niagara Falls). He also ran for mayor of Niagara Falls in 2003 and for Niagara Falls city council in 2006. Wood had been nominated to run for city council in Stittsville Ward, but was nominated for mayor on July 17.

Dropped out

Robert Gilles Gauthier
Ran for numerous offices including mayor in 1997 and 2010. He was nominated on April 29. He later dropped out of the running.

Polls

Mayoral results

Note: Colour corresponds to main campaign colour. "(X)" denotes incumbent.

Results by ward

City Council

Orléans Ward
Incumbent councillor Bob Monette ran for re-election.

Nominated:
R. Gordon Jensen - retired naval officer
Bob Monette - incumbent councillor
Jennifer Robitaille - ran in this ward in 2010, winning 14%

Results:

Innes Ward
Incumbent councillor Rainer Bloess did not run for re-election.

Nominated:
Laura Dudas - President of the Blackburn Community Association, former Ottawa Sun journalist, works for the City of Ottawa in corporate communications
Chris Fraser - Ran in this Ward in 2010, finishing third with 12% of the vote. 
Eldon Holder
Chantal Lecours - Conseil des écoles publiques de l'Est de l'Ontario trustee since 2004. 
Master Cpl. Jody Mitic - Candidate on The Amazing Race Canada.
Andrew Modray
Fred Sherwin - Former candidate in Orleans Ward in 2010.
François Trépanier
Teresa Whitmore - Former city councillor in Belleville, Ontario (2000-2003).

Dropped out:
Mathieu Fortin
Roland Stieda

Results:

Barrhaven Ward
Incumbent councillor Jan Harder ran for re-election.

Nominated:
 Ian Bursey
 Jan Harder - incumbent councillor 
 Syed Asghar Hussain

Results:

Kanata North Ward
Incumbent councillor Marianne Wilkinson ran for re-election.

Nominated:
Matt Muirhead - Teacher; Ran in this ward in 2006
Jeff Seeton - Tech entrepreneur; Ran in this ward in 2006 and 2010 
Marianne Wilkinson - incumbent councillor

Results:

West Carleton-March Ward
Incumbent councillor Eli El-Chantiry ran for re-election.

Nominated:
Alexander Aronec
Eli El-Chantiry - incumbent councillor
Brendan Gorman
Jonathan Mark - former radio host on 106.9 FM (The Bear) ("Gonzo" with Kaz & Jay)  
James Parsons

Results:

Stittsville Ward
Incumbent councillor Shad Qadri ran for re-election.

Nominated:
David Lee
Shad Qadri - incumbent councillor

Results:

Bay Ward
Incumbent councillor Mark Taylor ran for re-election.

Nominated:
Alex Cullen - former city councillor for this ward 
George Guirguis 
Brendan Mertens 
Michael Pastien 
Trevor Robinson
Mark Taylor - incumbent

Results:

College Ward
Incumbent councillor Rick Chiarelli ran for re-election.

Nominated:
Guy Annable 
Rick Chiarelli - incumbent councillor 
Craig MacAulay
Scott Andrew McLarens

Dropped out:
Basil Swedani

Results:

Knoxdale-Merivale Ward
Incumbent councillor Keith Egli ran for re-election.

Nominated:
Keith Egli - incumbent councillor 
Cristian Lambiri - engineering manager

Results:

Gloucester-Southgate Ward
Incumbent councillor Diane Deans ran for re-election.

Nominated:
Meladul Haq Ahmadzai
Rodaina Chahrour
Diane Deans - incumbent councillor 
George Marko
Lilly Obina
Brad Pye - Federal NDP candidate in Dartmouth—Cole Harbour in 2008.
Mohamed Roble - reserve medic in the Canadian Forces

Results:

Beacon Hill-Cyrville Ward
Incumbent councillor Tim Tierney ran for re-election.

Nominated:
Francesca D'Ambrosio 
Nicolas Séguin 
Tim Tierney - incumbent councillor 
Michel Tardif
Rene Tessier

Results:

Rideau-Vanier Ward
Incumbent councillor Mathieu Fleury ran for re-election.

Nominated:
George Atanga
Marc Aubin - former president of the Lowertown Community Association 
Mathieu Fleury - incumbent councillor 
Catherine Fortin LeFaivre - communications director at a national not-for-profit 
David George Oldham 
Marc Vinette

Dropped out
Jeff Pierce

Results:

Rideau-Rockcliffe Ward
Incumbent councillor Peter D. Clark ran for re-election.

Nominated:
Peter D. Clark - incumbent councillor
Cam Holmstrom - Metis resident of ward, Teacher, Legislative Assistant to Quebec NDP MP Romeo Saganash
Jevone Nicholas - Former president of the Vanier Community Association, and federal public servant
Tobi Nussbaum - public servant
Sheila Perry - former Overbrook Community Association President
Penny Thompson

Dropped out:
Marc Belisle

Results:

Somerset Ward
Incumbent councillor Diane Holmes retired.

Nominated:
Martin Canning - Consultant and environmentalist
Edward Conway - Lawyer
Catherine McKenney - Former aide to the deputy city manager, former assistant to Holmes.
Thomas McVeigh - Former head of the Centretown Citizens Community Association
Conor Meade - Entrepreneur
Jeff Morrison - Former president of the Centretown Community Health Centre
Sandro Provenzano 
Silviu Riley - IT worker
Denis Schryburt - Gay-community activist
Curtis Tom 
Lili V. Weemen

Dropped out:
Diane Holmes - incumbent councillor

Results:

Kitchissippi Ward
Incumbent councillor Katherine Hobbs ran for re-election.

Nominated:
Katherine Hobbs - incumbent councillor 
Jeff Leiper - Former president of the Hintonburg Community Association
Ellen Lougheed
Michelle Reimer
Larry Wasslen

Dropped out:
Dovi Chein

Results:

River Ward
Incumbent councillor Maria McRae did not run for re-election.

Nominated:
Riley Brockington - Former Ottawa-Carleton District School Board Trustee
Barbara Carroll
Don Francis - Former Ottawa Board of Education Trustee
Antonio Giannetti 
Jeff Koscik 
Michael Kostiuk - Former President of the Carlington Community Association
Mike Patton - Ontario Progressive Conservative Party candidate in the 2007 Ontario general election in Ottawa West—Nepean (provincial electoral district) and former staffer for former mayor Larry O'Brien
Colin Pennie
Vanessa Nicki Sutton
Bruce Winchester

Results:

Capital Ward
Incumbent councillor David Chernushenko ran for re-election.

Nominated:
Scott Blurton
David Chernushenko - incumbent councillor
Espoir Manirambona - Communist Party of Ontario candidate in Ottawa South in the 2014 Ontario general election.

Results:

Alta Vista Ward
Incumbent councillor Peter Hume did not run for re-election.

Nominated:
Adam Bowick
Daher Muse Calin
Jean Cloutier - Canterbury Community Association President
Clinton Cowan - 2010 candidate in this ward. South East Ottawa Community Health Centre Vice-President and former Chair of the Community Relations Committee. Alta Vista Community Association, Director. 
Jeff Dubois 
Hussein Mahmoud 
Perry Marleau - candidate in this ward in 2006. 
John Redins - Party for People with Special Needs candidate in Ottawa South in the 2014 provincial election, 2013 by-election and 2011 provincial election. 
Brandon Scharfe

Dropped out:
Peter Hume - incumbent councillor 
Douglas William Smith

Results:

Cumberland Ward
Incumbent councillor Stephen Blais ran for re-election.

Nominated:
Stephen Blais - incumbent councillor 
Marc Belisle (originally running in Rideau-Rockcliffe)

Dropped out:
Troy Dubé

Results:

Osgoode Ward
Incumbent councillor Doug Thompson declined to run for re-election.

Nominated:
George Darouze
Tom Dawson
Davis Jermacans
Jean Johnston-McKitterick
Liam Maguire, brother of mayoral candidate Mike Maguire
Bob Masaro
Allen Scantland
Mark Scharfe 
Kim Sheldrick
Paul St. Jean
George Wright

Dropped out:
Justin Campbell
Bruce Faulkner

Results:

Rideau-Goulbourn Ward
Incumbent councillor Scott Moffatt ran for re-election.

Nominated
Scott Moffatt
Dan Scharf

Results:

Gloucester-South Nepean Ward
Incumbent councillor Steve Desroches did not run for re-election.

Nominated:
Kevin Fulsom - day trader and writer/producer for a small video game company. Past volunteer for the Ontario NDP. Grandson of former mayor George Nelms and nephew of former Progressive Conservative MPP Frank Klees.
Scott Hodge - president of the Riverside South Community Association
Jason Kelly - local business owner
Michael Qaqish - former aide for councillor Desroches.
Bader Rashed - Owner of Canada Capital Cleaners Inc.
Roger Scharfe 
Susan Sherring - Ottawa Sun columnist.

Dropped out:
Michael Falardeau

Results:

Kanata South Ward
Incumbent councillor Allan Hubley ran for re-election.

Nominated
David Abuwa
Allan Hubley - incumbent councillor
Bruce Anthony Faulkner

Results:

School Board Trustee

Ottawa Catholic School Board

Ottawa-Carleton District School Board

Conseil des écoles catholiques du Centre-Est

Conseil des écoles publiques de l'Est de l'Ontario

References

External links
Nominated candidates

2014
2014 Ontario municipal elections
election, 2014